The 2022 Alcorn State Braves football team represented Alcorn State University as a member of the Southwestern Athletic Conference (SWAC) during the 2022 NCAA Division I FCS football season. They were led by head coach Fred McNair, who was coaching his sixth season with the program. The Braves played their home games at Casem-Spinks Stadium in Lorman, Mississippi.

Schedule
Alcorn State finalized their 2022 schedule on March 22, 2022.

References

Alcorn State Braves
Alcorn State Braves football seasons
Alcorn State Braves